Nigeria competed at the 2000 Summer Olympics in Sydney, Australia.

Medalists

Athletics

Men
Track and road events

Field events

Men
Track and road events

Field events

Boxing

Men

Football

Men's tournament

Team roster
Head coach:  Jo Bonfrere

Stand-by players

Group play

Quarterfinal

Women's tournament

Team roster
Head coach: Mabo Ismaila

Nigeria named a squad of 18 players and 4 alternates for the tournament.

Group play

Judo

Men

Women

Swimming

Men

Women

Table Tennis

Men

Women

Weightlifting

Men

Women

Wrestling

Freestyle

See also
 Nigeria at the 1998 Commonwealth Games
 Nigeria at the 2002 Commonwealth Games

References

Wallechinsky, David (2004). The Complete Book of the Summer Olympics (Athens 2004 Edition). Toronto, Canada. . 
International Olympic Committee (2001). The Results. Retrieved 12 November 2005.
Sydney Organising Committee for the Olympic Games (2001). Official Report of the XXVII Olympiad Volume 1: Preparing for the Games. Retrieved 20 November 2005.
Sydney Organising Committee for the Olympic Games (2001). Official Report of the XXVII Olympiad Volume 2: Celebrating the Games. Retrieved 20 November 2005.
Sydney Organising Committee for the Olympic Games (2001). The Results. Retrieved 20 November 2005.
International Olympic Committee Web Site
sports-reference

Nations at the 2000 Summer Olympics
2000
Olympics